
Year 174 BC was a year of the pre-Julian Roman calendar. At the time it was known as the Year of the Consulship of Paullulus and Scaevola (or, less frequently, year 580 Ab urbe condita). The denomination 174 BC for this year has been used since the early medieval period, when the Anno Domini calendar era became the prevalent method in Europe for naming years.

Events 
 By place 

 Mongolia 
 The Xiongnu attack the Yuezhi, and force them away from Gansu.

Deaths 
 Mete Khan, emperor and founder of the Xiongnu Empire, who has united various Hun confederations under his rule (b. 234 BC)
 Publius Aelius Paetus, Roman consul and censor
 Titus Quinctius Flamininus, Roman general and statesman whose skillful diplomacy has enabled him to establish a Roman protectorate over Greece (b. c. 227 BC) (approximate date)

References